Jens Jacob Nielsen Bregnø (9 February 1877 – 26 March 1946), often referred to as J. J. Bregnø, was a Danish sculptor and ceramics designer. He collaborated with Bing & Grøndahl, Saxbo and Dahl Jensen Porcelain and also designed silver for Kay Bojesen. He received the Eckersberg Medal in 1919.

Early life and education
He was born in Hedensted, near Horsens, the son of shoemaker Mads Nielsen (1843–87) and Elise Laursen (1854-31). He changed his surname to Bregnø in 1913. He initially  completed an apprenticeship as a joiner and woodcarver in Aarhus and then apprenticed as a stobenason in Stockholm from 1898. He worked as a decorative sculptor in stucco artist Hans Lamberg-Petersen's workshop in Copenhagen from 1902 to 1905 and then continued his studies in Italy, France and Germany until 1908.

Career

From 1907 to 1911, Bregnø created a number of ceramic works that were burnt in Patrick Nordström's workshop in Islev. He later created numerous statuettes for Bing & Grøndahl in collaboration with the company's artistic director Hans Tegner. He later also worked for Dahl-Jensen and Nathalie Krebs' Saxbo.

Bregnø also created unica works in his own name that were burnt at different workshops, including Saxbo in Herlev and Hjorth in Rønne on Bornholm. He also designed stoneware for Saxbo and silver for Kay Bojesen.

His studio was located at Haraldsgade 18 in the Nørrebro district of Copenhagen. He was a member of Kunstforeningen af 18. November.

A Hercules sculpture by Bregnø was installed in Nørrebroparken in 1936. It has later been moved to a new site in Fælledparken. His statue The Humane Nurse, a monument to Danish nurses, was installed in front of Bispebjerg Hospital in 1941.

Personal life
Bregnø joined the Danish Nazi Party on 28 August 1940. After the war he was blacklisted by former collaborators and received no commissions. He died on 26 March 1946 and is buried in Vestre Cemetery in Copenhagen.

Selected works

 Danaide (1912)
 Samson (1912, Statens Museum for Kunst)
 Druepigefontæne (1929)
 Satyrdreng med en gås
Susanne i Badet (fountain), bronze and Cementsten
 Læsende Pige ( "Poesien")
  Lyttende Pige ("Samvittigheden"), Cararamarmor
 Diana (sundial), Bronze and tax wood plinth 
 Baccantinde, stoneware 
 Vinhøst
 Hemmeligheden
 Moder og Barn
 Trillinger
 Firlinger
 Fad. Eva og Slangen
 Fad. Eva med Æbler
 Satyrhoved
 Geden malkes
 Anger
 Menneskepar
 Elskende Par, stoneware
 Venus og Amor
  Thor og Midgaardsormen
 Pegasus
 Lyksaligheden
  Druepigen
 Haarfletningen, rec clay
 Herkules paa Skillevejen
  Nilmoderen, bronze
 Fuglebad, stoneware
 HavhexenPublic art
 Herkules, Dyden og Lasten (1936; Nørrebroparken, later moved to Fælledparken)
 The Humane Nurse'' (1941, Bispebjerg Hospital)

References

External links

1877 births
1946 deaths
20th-century Danish sculptors
Male sculptors
Danish designers
Danish stonemasons
People from Hedensted Municipality
Danish Nazis
Danish male artists
20th-century Danish male artists